David Lawrence Gordon (July 22, 1943 – February 9, 1996) was an American entrepreneur who founded computer game publishers Programma International and Datamost.

References

American entertainment industry businesspeople
People in the video game industry
1943 births
1996 deaths
20th-century American businesspeople
People from Brooklyn